Maria of Serbia or Marija of Serbia may refer to:

 Maria of Serbia (sultana), daughter of despot George Branković of Serbia
 Maria of Serbia, Queen of Bosnia, daughter of despot Lazar Branković of Serbia
 Maria of Serbia, Marchioness of Montferrat, daughter of despot Stefan Branković of Serbia

See also
 Maria (disambiguation)
 Serbia (disambiguation)